The 2020 Scotties Tournament of Hearts, Canada's national women's curling championship, was held from February 15 to 23 at Mosaic Place in Moose Jaw, Saskatchewan. The winning team was scheduled to represent Canada at the 2020 World Women's Curling Championship at the CN Centre in Prince George, British Columbia.

Manitoba's Kerri Einarson defeated Ontario's Rachel Homan 8–7 in the final.

On February 18, New Brunswick's Andrea Crawford rink scored seven points in the seventh end to set a new Canadian women's national championship record for most points scored in a single end, going on to defeat Kerri Einarson's undefeated and top-ranked Manitoba rink 13–7 in Draw 10 of the tournament. In Draw 12 on February 19, Northern Ontario skip Krista McCarville curled a perfect 100% game in a 4–3 win over Alberta's Laura Walker.

Teams
Source:

CTRS ranking

Wild card game
A wild card play-in game was played on February 14. It was contested between the top two teams on the Canadian Team Ranking System standings who did not win their provincial championship: the East St. Paul Curling Club's Tracy Fleury rink, and the St. Vital Curling Club's Jennifer Jones rink, both curling in the Winnipeg Metro Region. Team Wild Card entered the Scotties as the number 3 seed.

Wild card Game
Friday, February 14, 7:30 pm

Round robin standings
Final Round Robin Standings

Round robin results

All draw times are listed in Central Time (UTC−06:00).

Draw 1
Saturday, February 15, 1:30 pm

Draw 2
Saturday, February 15, 6:30 pm

Draw 3
Sunday, February 16, 8:30 am

Draw 4
Sunday, February 16, 1:30 pm

Draw 5
Sunday, February 16, 6:30 pm

Draw 6
Monday, February 17, 8:30 am

Draw 7
Monday, February 17, 1:30 pm

Draw 8
Monday, February 17, 6:30 pm

Draw 9
Tuesday, February 18, 8:30 am

Draw 10
Tuesday, February 18, 1:30 pm

New Brunswick's seven-ender scored against Manitoba was the most points scored in a single end in Tournament of Hearts history.

Draw 11
Tuesday, February 18, 6:30 pm

Draw 12
Wednesday, February 19, 8:30 am

Northern Ontario skip Krista McCarville curled a perfect 100% game.

Draw 13
Wednesday, February 19, 1:30 pm

Draw 14
Wednesday, February 19, 6:30 pm

Tiebreakers
Thursday, February 20, 8:00 am

Championship pool standings
The top four teams from each pool advance to the championship pool. All wins and losses earned in the round robin will be carried forward into the championship Pool. Wins in tiebreaker games are not carried forward.

Final Championship Pool Standings

Championship pool results

Draw 16
Thursday, February 20, 12:30 pm

Draw 17
Thursday, February 20, 6:30 pm

Draw 18
Friday, February 21, 12:30 pm

Draw 19
Friday, February 21, 6:30 pm

Playoffs

1 vs. 2
Saturday, February 22, 6:00 pm

3 vs. 4
Saturday, February 22, 1:00 pm

Semifinal
Sunday, February 23, 11:00 am

Final
Sunday, February 23, 6:00 pm

Statistics

Top 5 player percentages
After Championship Pool; minimum 5 games

Perfect games

Awards
The awards and all-star teams were as follows:
All-Star Teams

First Team
Skip:  Rachel Homan, Ontario
Third:  Val Sweeting, Manitoba
Second:  Shannon Birchard, Manitoba
Lead:  Lisa Weagle, Ontario

Second Team
Skip:  Kerri Einarson, Manitoba
Third:  Emma Miskew, Ontario
Second:  Joanne Courtney, Ontario
Lead:  Rachelle Brown, Team Canada

Marj Mitchell Sportsmanship Award
 Rachelle Brown, Team Canada

Joan Mead Builder Award
 Deanna Rindal, long-time curling umpire based in the Prince Albert area.

Final standings

Notes

References

External links

 
Scotties Tournament of Hearts
Curling in Saskatchewan
Scotties Tournament of Hearts
Scotties Tournament of Hearts
Sport in Moose Jaw